Jakub of Sienno was a medieval Bishop of Kraków in the years 1461–1463, Bishop of Włocławek from 1464, and then Archbishop of Gniezno from 1474. He was also a 15th-century diplomat for the Polish Crown.

Early life
Jakob was born in 1413 in Sienno, the son of Dobisław of Oleśnicy a local aristocrat of the Debno family and his wife Catherine Oleśnicka, daughter of Dymitr of Goraj.  His father, Dobiesława Olesnica mala Dębno, was Count of Sandomierz.

His brothers were:
 John of Sienna Castellan of Lwów
 Dymitr of Sienna (d. 1465) Canon of Kraków
 Nicholas of Sienna (d. 1484) Archdeacon of Sandomierz
 Paul of Sienna (c. 1410–1444) the Royal Secretary
 Andrzej Sienieński (d. 1494) Chamberlain of Sandomierz
 He was also a nephew of Cardinal Oleśnicki.

He studied law and Theology in Rome and from 1435 was a Canon of Kraków Cathedral.

Diplomatic career

As a diplomat he served as Secretary of King Vladislav Varnenchik and King Casimir IV Jagiellon. He was sent on missions to Hungary in 1442 and 1448 and in 1459 he represented the King at the Congress of Mantua.

Episcopal career
After the death of his uncle, Cardinal Zbigniew Oleśnicki, in 1455 he was administrator of the diocese of Kraków.

Pope Pius II appointed him Bishop of Kraków. Unfortunately, the King had other plans and request the appointment of John Gruszczynski, consecrated on May 31, 1461.  The conflict escalated with the Pope (Pius II) on 2 June 1461, threatening to excommunicate the King. The King then banished Jakub.

Eventually on 16 January 1462 the conflict was resolved through intersession of the papal legate Jerome Lando, Archbishop of Crete.  In January 1463 at the Sejm in Piotrków the Kings appointee abdicated the bishopric of Kraków.

Pope Pius II compensated Jakob and he received the bishopric of Włocławek.  In Włocławek and in Gniezno he installed oak pew stalls and rich liturgical equipment, and donated to the library of Kraków Academy.

In 1465 he represented the King at the meeting with the Teutonic Knights in Toruń, that ended the Thirteen Years' War.

In 1466 he represented the King during the discussions with the Teutonic Knights in Toruń, ending the 13-year-old war. He was a signatory to the Act of peace of 1466.

He died 4 October 1480 in Łowicz and was buried in the Cathedral of Gniezno. He erected the cross on the Cathedral, still there today.

References

External links
 Virtual tour Gniezno Cathedral  
List of Primates of Poland 

Bishops of Kraków
1413 births
1480 deaths
15th-century Roman Catholic bishops in Poland